Gerald Edward Miller (July 1, 1919 – November 6, 2014) was a vice admiral in the United States Navy. He was a commander of the United States Sixth Fleet (from October 1971 – June 1973). He graduated in 1942 from the United States Naval Academy. Miller died of cancer in 2014 at his home in Oakton, Virginia.

References

United States Naval Academy alumni
United States Navy admirals
1919 births
2014 deaths
People from Sheridan, Wyoming
People from Oakton, Virginia
Deaths from cancer in Virginia